The 2004 Reading Borough Council election was held on 10 June 2004, at the same time as other local elections across England and Wales and the European elections. Following boundary changes the number of seats on Reading Borough Council had been increased from 45 to 46 with the creation of a new single-member ward called Mapledurham and changes to the boundaries of several existing wards. All 46 seats on the council were up for election. Labour, led by David Sutton, retained its 35 seats on the council and therefore kept its majority. The Conservatives, led by Fred Pugh, gained one seat at the election from the Liberal Democrats and won the new Mapledurham seat, meaning they overtook the Liberal Democrats to become the second largest party on the council with six seats. The Liberal Democrats, led by Bob Green, were left with five seats.

Results

Ward results
The results in each ward were as follows:

References

2004 English local elections
2004